Leslie Edward Rowell (22 October 1921 – 13 August 2008) was an Australian rules footballer who played with St Kilda in the Victorian Football League (VFL).

Notes

External links 

1921 births
2008 deaths
Australian rules footballers from Victoria (Australia)
St Kilda Football Club players
Prahran Football Club players